"I'm Lost Without You" is a song by Blink-182.

I'm Lost Without You may also refer to:
"I'm Lost Without You", a 1945 song by Al Dexter
"I'm Lost Without You", a 1965 song by Billy Fury

See also
 Lost Without You (disambiguation)